Hassan Hamze is a Lebanese fencer. He competed in the individual foil and épée events at the 1980 Summer Olympics, not winning any bouts and losing nine.

References

External links
 

Living people
Year of birth missing (living people)
Lebanese male épée fencers
Olympic fencers of Lebanon
Fencers at the 1980 Summer Olympics
Lebanese male foil fencers